The COVID-19 pandemic in Mauritania is part of the worldwide pandemic of coronavirus disease 2019 caused by severe acute respiratory syndrome coronavirus 2. The COVID-19 pandemic was confirmed to have reached Mauritania in March 2020.


Background 
On 12 January 2020, the World Health Organization (WHO) confirmed that a novel coronavirus was the cause of a respiratory illness in a cluster of people in Wuhan City, Hubei Province, China, which was reported to the WHO on 31 December 2019.

The case fatality ratio for COVID-19 has been much lower than SARS of 2003, but the transmission has been significantly greater, with a significant total death toll. Model-based simulations for Mauritania indicate that the 95% confidence interval for the time-varying reproduction number R t has been lower than 1.0 since December 2020.

Timeline

March 2020
 On 13 March, the first case was confirmed, with the case being placed in isolation.
 The case is an expatriate from a yet to be disclosed country, in the Mauritanian capital of Nouakchott.
 On 18 March, the Mauritanian Minister of Health announced the discovery of a second positive coronavirus case on a foreign female employee, working at a house of a couple of expatriates, the woman arrived 10 days prior the discovery.
 A third coronavirus case was declared on 26 March for a 74-year-old man, a Mauritanian citizen who had arrived in Mauritania on 15 March from France via Air France.
 The country recorded its first death on 30 March 2020. By the end of March there had been six confirmed cases, one death and two recoveries, leaving three active cases.

April to June 2020
 On 18 April, the last remaining active case recovered. On that date, there had been 7 confirmed cases in the country, 6 of whom had recovered, and one of whom had died, making Mauritania temporarily one of few affected countries in the world to become free of COVID-19.
 On 29 April, a Senegalese citizen tested positive. The case is a 68-year woman living in the state of Nouakchott.
 There were two new cases in April, bringing the total number of confirmed cases to 8. The death toll remained unchanged. Between 18 and 29 April there were no active cases; at the end of April the woman having tested positive on 29 April was the only active case.
 On 6 May, with only one active case, restrictions were partially eased. By the end of May, the number confirmed active cases had increased to 480 while the death toll had increased to 23. The total number of confirmed cases grew to 530 in May, 27 of whom recovered.
 There were 3707 new cases in June, bringing the total number of confirmed cases to 4237. The death toll rose to 128. There were 2612 active cases at the end of June.

July to September 2020
 In July there were 2073 new cases, bringing the total number of confirmed cases to 6310. The death toll rose to 157. The number of recovered patients since the start of the outbreak reached 4962, leaving 1191 active cases at the end of the month — less than half the number of active cases a month before.
 There were 738 new cases in August, bringing the total number of confirmed cases to 7048. The death toll rose to 159. At the end of August there were 425 active cases.
 There were 440 new cases in September, bringing the total number of confirmed cases to 7488. The death toll rose to 161. The number of recovered patients increased to 7111, leaving 216 active cases at the end of the month.

October to December 2020
 There were 215 new cases in October, bringing the total number of confirmed cases to 7703. The death toll rose to 163. The number of recovered patients increased to 7433, leaving 107 active cases at the end of the month.
 There were 898 new cases in November, raising the total number of confirmed cases to 8601. The death toll rose to 177. The number of recovered patients increased to 7732, leaving 692 active cases at the end of the month.
 There were 5763 new cases in December, raising the total number of confirmed cases to 14364. The death toll nearly doubled to 349. The number of recovered patients increased to 11678, leaving 2637 active cases at the end of the month.

January to March 2021
 There were 2271 new cases in January, taking the total number of confirmed cases to 16635. The death toll rose to 422. The number of recovered patients increased to 15676, leaving 537 active cases at the end of the month.
 There were 572 new cases in February, taking the total number of confirmed cases to 17207. The death toll rose to 441. The number of recovered patients increased to 16563, leaving 203 active cases at the end of the month.
 Vaccinations started on 26 March, initially using 50,000 doses of the Sinopharm BIBP vaccine and 5,000 doses of the Pfizer–BioNTech COVID-19 vaccine donated by the United Arab Emirates.
 There were 640 new cases in March, taking the total number of confirmed cases to 17847. The death toll rose to 449. The number of recovered patients increased to 17093, leaving 305 active cases at the end of the month.

April to June 2021
 There were 555 new cases in April, taking the total number of confirmed cases to 18402. The death toll rose to 455. The number of recovered patients increased to 17687, leaving 260 active cases at the end of the month.
 There were 1145 new cases in May, taking the total number of confirmed cases to 19547. The death toll rose to 463. The number of recovered patients increased to 18513, leaving 571 active cases at the end of the month.
 There were 1261 new cases in June, taking the total number of confirmed cases to 20808. The death toll rose to 489. The number of recovered patients increased to 20016, leaving 529 active cases at the end of the month.

July to September 2021
 There were 5165 new cases in July, raising the total number of confirmed cases to 25973. The death toll rose to 567. The number of recovered patients increased to 22406, leaving 3000 active cases at the end of the month.
 There were 7607 new cases in August, raising the total number of confirmed cases to 33580. The death toll rose to 715. The number of recovered patients increased to 30525, leaving 2340 active cases at the end of the month.
 There were 2450 new cases in September, raising the total number of confirmed cases to 36030. The death toll rose to 775. The number of recovered patients increased to 34633, leaving 622 active cases at the end of the month.

October to December 2021
 There were 1290 new cases in October, bringing the total number of confirmed cases to 37320. The death toll rose to 797. The number of recovered patients increased to 35949, leaving 574 active cases at the end of the month.
 There were 1946 new cases in November, bringing the total number of confirmed cases to 39266. The death toll rose to 832. The number of recovered patients increased to 37546, leaving 888 active cases at the end of the month.
 There were 2207 new cases in December, bringing the total number of confirmed cases to 41473. The death toll rose to 866. The number of recovered patients increased to 39175, leaving 1432 active cases at the end of the month. Modelling by WHO's Regional Office for Africa suggests that due to under-reporting, the true number of infections by the end of 2021 was around 2.1 million while the true number of COVID-19 deaths was around 1083.

January to March 2022
 On 4 January, it was confirmed that President Mohamed Ould Ghazouani had tested positive for COVID-19.
 There were 16725 new cases in January, raising the total number of confirmed cases to 58198. The death toll rose to 953. The number of recovered patients increased to 54486, leaving 2759 active cases at the end of the month.
 There were 434 new cases in February, bringing the total number of confirmed cases to 58632. The death toll rose to 979. The number of recovered patients increased to 57602, leaving 51 active cases at the end of the month.
 There were 38 new cases in March, bringing the total number of confirmed cases to 58670. The death toll rose to 982. The number of recovered patients increased to 57679, leaving nine active cases at the end of the month.

April to June 2022
 There were 18 new cases in April, bringing the total number of confirmed cases to 58688. The death toll remained unchanged. The number of recovered patients increased to 57695, leaving 11 active cases at the end of the month.
 There were 435 new cases in May, bringing the total number of confirmed cases to 59123. The death toll remained unchanged. The number of recovered patients increased to 57890, leaving 251 active cases at the end of the month.
 There were 691 new cases in June, bringing the total number of confirmed cases to 59814. The death toll rose to 983. The number of recovered patients increased to 58306, leaving 525 active cases at the end of the month.

July to September 2022
 There were 2758 new cases in July, bringing the total number of confirmed cases to 62572. The death toll rose to 992. The number of recovered patients increased to 60980, leaving 600 active cases at the end of the month.
 There were 193 new cases in August, bringing the total number of confirmed cases to 62765. The death toll rose to 993. The number of recovered patients increased to 61731, leaving 41 active cases at the end of the month.
 There were 61 new cases in September, bringing the total number of confirmed cases to 62826. The death toll rose to 995.

October to December 2022
 There were 529 new cases in October, bringing the total number of confirmed cases to 63355. The death toll rose to 997. The number of recovered patients increased to 62252, leaving 106 active cases at the end of the month.
 There were 66 new cases in November, bringing the total number of confirmed cases to 63421. The death toll remained unchanged. The number of recovered patients increased to 62422, leaving two active cases at the end of the month.
 There were four new cases in December, bringing the total number of confirmed cases to 63425. The death toll remained unchanged.

January to December 2023
 There were 240 new cases in January, bringing the total number of confirmed cases to 63665. The death toll remained unchanged.
 There were three new cases in February, bringing the total number of confirmed cases to 63668. The death toll remained unchanged.

Statistics

Confirmed new cases per day

Confirmed deaths per day

See also 
 COVID-19 pandemic in Africa
 COVID-19 pandemic by country and territory

Notes

References

External links
 West Africa: Responding to the Pandemic Amid Multi-Layered Crises in the Sahel - "Stop the Virus, Not the People"
 West Africa: The G 5 Sahel - Survival in Time of COVID-19.

coronavirus pandemic
coronavirus pandemic
Mauritania
Mauritania
Disease outbreaks in Mauritania